Willy is an American situation comedy about a small-town female lawyer who later moves to New York City. It aired on CBS from September 1954 to June 1955. The series stars June Havoc and was produced by Desilu Productions.

Synopsis
A vaudeville star as a child, Willa "Willy" Dodger is inspired by her father, who had been a circuit court judge, to become a lawyer. After four years of night school, she graduates from law school, passes the bar, and opens a law practice in her home town of Renfrew in rural New Hampshire. After six months in business, she finally gets her first case. Her family in Renfrew includes her father, William Makepeace "Papa" Dodger, her widowed sister Emily Dodger, and her nephew Franklin Sanders. Her boyfriend is Charlie Bush, the town veterinarian.

In March 1955, the lack of legal business in Renfrew prompts Willy to relocate to New York City to represent a vaudeville troupe, the Bannister Vaudeville Company. Charlie does not follow her, but her family reluctantly makes the move with her. In her far more cosmopolitan life in New York, her boss — who thought he had hired a male lawyer — is Perry Bannister. She also reunites with her old friend Harvey Evelyn, who is the manager of a repertory company.

Whether in Renfrew or New York, Willy′s law practice usually handles cases that are on the lighter side of the law.

Cast

Willa "Willy" Dodger...June Havoc
William Makepeace "Papa" Dodger...Lloyd Corrigan
Emily Dodger...Mary Treen
Franklin Sanders...Danny Richards, Jr.
Charlie Bush...Whitfield Connor
Perry Bannister...Hal Peary (1955)
Harvey Evelyn...Sterling Holloway (1955)

Some confusion exists as to who portrayed Papa Dodger. Wheaton Chambers, misspelled as "Weaton Chambers," is credited in the premiere episode, but Lloyd Corrigan generally is credited with the role. It is possible that Chambers originated the role and Corrigan subsequently replaced him.

Production
Willy was filmed at Desilu Studios. William Spier, Havoc's third and last husband, was the producer for the series. Although female lawyers already had been the lead characters on daytime television shows, Willy was the first prime-time American television show to feature a female lawyers as its lead character.

Willy′s original working title was Miss Bachelor at Law, but by the time its pilot was filmed before a live audience at Motion Picture Center (later known as Desilu Studios) on April 29, 1954, it had been renamed My Aunt Willy, and by the beginning of August 1954 it was called The Artful Miss Dodger. It finally became Willy before it premiered in September 1954.

Willy had low ratings during its first few months, and in January 1955, press reports indicated that Willy′s sponsor, General Mills, wanted to replace the show. In a February 1955 interview, June Havoc said the show was having trouble convincing television viewers of the mid-1950s that there was such a thing as a female lawyer and that female lawyers did not "all look like Victorian spinsters."

In an attempt to boost Willy′s ratings, the Willy Dodger character moved from rural New Hampshire to New York City in March 1955, the show′s producers hoping that the new premise would give June Havoc a better opportunity to display her comedic and dancing talents. Havoc visited the American Guild of Variety Artists (AGVA) to prepare for her portrayal of her character as working for the AGVA, although in the show the Willy character apparently worked for the Bannister Vaudeville Company rather than the AGVA.

In April 1955, Willy moved from Saturday to Thursday nights. Neither the change of premise or the change of schedule saved the show, and by early May 1955 General Mills had dropped its sponsorship of the series. Willy completed production in May 1955 after 39 episodes, and June Havoc checked into a hospital for five days of rest and relaxation after production wrapped.

Reception

When Willy debuted in September 1954, critic Larry Wolters of the Chicago Daily Tribune described the Willy Dodger character as “a young Portia,” a reference to the heroine of William Shakespeare’s The Merchant of Venice. Associated Press radio and television editor C. E. Butterfield wrote that the premiere episode suggested that “the story sounds as if it might develop, although it may take a little time to build up an audience.” Willy never found that audience. It was rated the lowest of all new CBS shows and one of the lowest of new programs on any network in December 1954, and the third-lowest of new CBS shows and one of the lowest of new situation comedies on any network in January 1955.

In 1957, June Havoc said that she believed Willy had failed because it had been designed as a show for a  family to sit together and watch, something that she thought no family would do during Willy′s time slot at 10:30 p.m. on Saturday.

Broadcast history
Premiering on September 18, 1954, Willy began its run airing on Saturdays at 10:30 p.m. Eastern Time through March 1955. 
It followed That's My Boy, another situation comedy on the CBS Saturday lineup, and aired opposite Your Hit Parade on NBC. In April 1955, Willy moved to Thursdays at 10:30 p.m. Eastern Time, where it remained for the rest of its run. It was cancelled after a single season, and its last original episode was broadcast on June 16, 1955.

After the show′s last new episode, CBS broadcast reruns of Willy for three more weeks in its Thursday time slot, the last of them airing on July 7, 1955. Willy then ran in syndication for the rest of the 1950s before disappearing from the air.

Episodes
SOURCES

References

External links
 
 Willy at Television Obscurities
 Willy opening credits on YouTube

1954 American television series debuts
1955 American television series endings
1950s American sitcoms
1950s American legal television series
Black-and-white American television shows
English-language television shows
CBS original programming
Television shows set in New Hampshire
Television shows set in New York City
Television series by CBS Studios
Television series by Desilu Productions